Hisonotus devidei is a species of catfish in the family Loricariidae. It is a freshwater species native to South America, where it occurs in the Pandeiros River, a tributary of the São Francisco River. The species was described in 2018 by F. F. Roxo, G. S. C. Silva, and B. F. Melo on the basis of morphology and patterning, as it differs from other members of the genus Hisonotus by the presence of distinctive dark blotches. FishBase does not list this species.

References 

Otothyrinae
Fish of the São Francisco River basin